The Beauty of Lebanon, or The Mountain Spirit is a fantastic ballet in three acts and seven scenes, with choreography by Marius Petipa and music by Cesare Pugni. Libretto by E. Rappoport and Marius Petipa. The ballet was first presented by the Imperial Ballet on December 12/24 (Julian/Gregorian calendar dates), 1863 at the Imperial Bolshoi Kamenny Theatre in St. Petersburg, Russia, with Mariia Surovshchikova-Petipa (as the Mountain Spirit) and Timofei Stukolkin (as Beshir).

See also
 List of ballets by title

References

Ballets by Marius Petipa
Ballets by Cesare Pugni
1863 ballet premieres
Ballets premiered at the Bolshoi Theatre, Saint Petersburg